In enzymology, a deoxynucleoside kinase is an enzyme that catalyzes the chemical reaction

ATP + 2'-deoxynucleoside  ADP + 2'-deoxynucleoside 5'-phosphate

Thus, the two substrates of this enzyme are ATP and 2'-deoxynucleoside, whereas its two products are ADP and 2'-deoxynucleoside 5'-phosphate.

This enzyme belongs to the family of transferases, specifically those transferring phosphorus-containing groups (phosphotransferases) with an alcohol group as acceptor.  The systematic name of this enzyme class is ATP:deoxynucleoside 5'-phosphotransferase. Other names in common use include multispecific deoxynucleoside kinase, ms-dNK, multisubstrate deoxyribonucleoside kinase, multifunctional deoxynucleoside kinase, D. melanogaster deoxynucleoside kinase, and Dm-dNK.

Structural studies

References

 
 

EC 2.7.1
Enzymes of known structure